The Bath Bus Company is a bus operator in the United Kingdom which runs open top tours in Bath, Bristol and Cardiff, and the 'Bristol Air Decker' service between Bath and Bristol Airport. The company has been a subsidiary of the French RATP Group since 2011.

History

Bath Bus Company was formed in May 1997 by Martin Curtis and three other former Badgerline managers. It commenced operating open top tours in Bath with Bristol VRTs and an AEC Routemaster. It later diversified into the operation of tendered services. In 1999, Bath Bus Company became a City Sightseeing franchisee.

In June 2004, the business was purchased by Ensignbus, who transferred its existing City Sightseeing operations in Cardiff, Eastbourne and Windsor to become part of Bath Bus Company. In February 2011, the business was purchased by RATP Dev, the overseas division of RATP Group.

A service was started in March 2013 that linked Bath with Bristol Airport and branded 'Air Decker'. It offered through ticketing with Abus services in the Bristol area. On 21 November 2014, the company began a short-term service between Bristol and Bath using the country's first bus powered entirely by human and food waste. The biomethane gas is generated at Bristol sewage treatment works in Avonmouth, which is run by GENeco, a subsidiary of Wessex Water. The introduction of Bath's Clean Air Zone in March 2021 caused the Bath Bus Company to invest heavily in new buses for its services.

The Bath Bus Company introduced a new tour in nearby Bristol on 17 May 2021 which was branded TOOTbus. Bristol tours had been operated by Rubicon Tours from 1994 until 2020. The TOOTbus brand would also appear later that year on some tours in Bath but others would retain the more familiar City Sightseeing branding.

Services
As well as open top bus tours in Bath, Bristol and Cardiff, the Bath Bus Company operates a service from Bath to Bristol Airport branded as 'Air Decker'.

Fleet
The fleet consisted of 36 buses in October 2014.

References

External links

 Official websites:
Air Decker
City Sightseeing Bath
TootBus Bath

Bus operators in East Sussex
Bus transport in Cardiff
City Sightseeing
RATP Group
Transport in Bath, Somerset
Transport in Berkshire
1997 establishments in England